A venta, ventorro or ventorrillo is an establishment or building of ancient tradition in Spain and some other Hispanic countries located near paths or unpopulated areas, and later near roads or service stations. They can be considered as an equivalent to inns, though their main characteristic feature is the fact that they are almost always isolated, contrary to mesones and posadas which are located near or inside towns and villages.

Throughout their history, ventas have offered food and accommodation to travellers. In Spain, their antiquity is well referenced and documented by literature, like in The Book of Good Love  (ca. 1330) or Don Quixote (1615), or in paintings like La riña en la Venta Nueva of Francisco Goya. Use of the term has also been registered in some Hispanic-American countries, like the Venta de Aguilar, the first one established in the Mexico-Veracruz road, or the popular Venta de Perote, both in Mexico.

Description 
Although the architectural structure may vary according to the popular models of each region or country, the ventas (which can be traced back to the Middle Ages), have in common their location, almost always isolated, in royal crossroads, paths, etc. Other similarities are: a big wooden door made accessible for carriages, which sometimes was the only access to the building; the stables and pens to accommodate the transiting livestock; haystacks to accommodate the muleteers and rooms, usually quite primitive, for traders, dealers and travellers. There were also a big kitchen and dining room in the first floor, a walled courtyard (sometimes more than one, and usually paved) with a well, troughs and a staircase to access the gallery and second floor, along with other storage rooms.

Taking as a reference the famous Venta de Quesada, that travellers, chroniclers and investigators have often identified as the venta-castle in which Alonso Quijano became knight, we have to consider its location in the Camino Real de Madrid a Sevilla, and as a provisioning point for the ventas of the Cañada Real Soriana Oriental. Although this venta of La Mancha, in ruins already in the 19th century, disappeared in the middle of the 20th century and there only remain some material remnants and the toponym in old maps, many scholars have studied its structure based on documents like the description by the traveller Alexandre Dumas circa 1846:

In Navarre and the Basque Country 

Along the cornisa cantábrica and with a renewed tradition in Navarre and the Basque Country –on both sides of the Pyrenees–, ventas ("bentas" in Basque or "ventes" in French) have been conserved as establishments with a varied traditional architecture, almost always located in crossroads. During the 21st century they still function as hostels, restaurants and shops. They are also used as places of celebrations and gastronomical gatherings. Their antiquity, as in the rest of Spain, is made patent by the frequency with which toponyms including the word "venta" (or "benta") are found.

Heritage protection 
The ventas of Castilla-La Mancha are a part of the cultural heritage of the region, and they are accordingly protected by law. The ventas of Borondo (Daimiel, Ciudad Real) and de la Inés (Almodóvar del Campo, Ciudad Real) have also been declared as goods of cultural interest.

In paintings, drawings, prints and engravings, the iconography of the ventas is usually associated with costumbrist themes or historical events.

Literary references

The ventas of Don Quixote 

The ventas, as typical constructions of the vernacular architecture of La Mancha, are described in various chapters by Cervantes as the scenery of various adventures and misadventures of the ingenious gentleman Don Quixote de la Mancha; among them, one of the most descriptive episodes may be the one in the second and following chapters of the first part of the novel.

The venta of the Archpriest of Hita 
Various excerpts of The Book of Good Love (1330 and 1343), recount the vicissitudes of Juan Ruiz, Archpriest of Hita in the medieval Venta de Cornejo, establishment in which –according to the author– he slept on various occasions in 1329.

The Andalusian venta of Bécquer 
Gustavo Adolfo Bécquer extensively describes an Andalusian venta in his account titled La Venta de los Gatos, published in November 1862, in the newsapaper El Contemporáneo.

The venta de Cidones 
In the second edition of Campos de Castilla, Antonio Machado published in 1917 a poem that takes place in the primitive Soriana Venta de Cidones, titled "Al maestro «Azorín» por su libro Castilla". It is considered as one of the defining texts of the most national aspect of the noventayochismo.

Non-exhaustive list of ventas

Andalusia 

 Venta de la Mascareta

Aragon 

 Venta de la Jaquesa

Castilla-La Mancha 

 Venta de Borondo (BIC)
 Venta de la Inés (BIC)
 Venta de Puerto Lápice

Castile and León 

 Venta Cornejo

Basque Country and Navarre

See also 

 Inn

Notes

References

External links

Restaurants by type
Hotels by type